Pointe au Baril may refer to:

Pointe au Baril, Ontario, a community in the Parry Sound District, Ontario, Canada
Pointe au Baril, a National Historic Site of Canada in Maitland, Ontario